WKNO (channel 10) is a PBS member television station in Memphis, Tennessee, United States. The station is owned by the Mid-South Public Communications Foundation, a non-profit organization governed by a board of trustees composed of volunteers, and is operated alongside NPR member WKNO-FM (91.1). The two stations share studios on Cherry Farms Road with the TV station's transmitter on Raleigh LaGrange Road, both in the Cordova section of unincorporated Shelby County.

History
The station first signed on the air on June 25, 1956 as Tennessee's first public television outlet. Its studios were first located in midtown Memphis, but would move several years later to rented space on the campus of Memphis State University (now the University of Memphis); in 1979, the studios were relocated a few blocks to the south, to the southern annex of the MSU campus on Getwell Road. That facility served the station for 30 years until November 2009, when the station moved into a custom-designed all-digital studio facility in Cordova.

From 1968 to 1981, WKNO's programming was repeated on WLJT in Lexington for viewers in the remainder of western Tennessee outside the Memphis metropolitan area. Afterward, that station eventually began broadcasting a separate programming schedule, including programming of local interest to that region.

Programming
Nationally distributed programming produced or presented by WKNO includes Travels & Traditions and other programs by Burt Wolf, Classic Gospel, Sun Studio Sessions, and GardenSMART.

Technical information

Subchannels
The station's digital signal is multiplexed:

Analog-to-digital conversion
WKNO discontinued regular programming on its analog signal, over VHF channel 10, on May 1, 2009. The station's digital signal remained on its pre-transition UHF channel 29, using PSIP to display WKNO's virtual channel as 10 on digital television receivers.

References

External links
Official website

KNO (TV)
PBS member stations
Television channels and stations established in 1956
1956 establishments in Tennessee